Anders W. Berthelsen (born 28 September 1969) is a Danish actor. He has appeared in more than 40 films and television shows since 1994.

Selected filmography

References

External links

1969 births
Living people
Danish male film actors
People from Rødovre